is a Japanese professional racing driver. He won the GT300 class Super GT championship in 2002 and 2019.

Career 

For the 1999 season, he switched to the GT300 class, finishing third in the championship that year. He won his maiden title in 2002 with Autobacs Racing Team Aguri (ARTA), driving an -prepared Toyota MR-S alongside . In the following years, with the series renamed as Super GT in 2005, Takagi won numerous races and finished runner-up in the standings in 2004, 2008, 2010 and 2018. In 2019, he won his second GT300 championship seventeen years after his first, driving the Honda NSX GT3 Evo of ARTA, with Takagi and his co-driver Nirei Fukuzumi finishing over ten points clear of the second place finishers.

Complete JGTC/Super GT Results 
(key) (Races in bold indicate pole position) (Races in italics indicate fastest lap)

References

External links 

1970 births
Living people
People from Yamaguchi Prefecture
Japanese racing drivers
Japanese Formula 3 Championship drivers
Super GT drivers

Team Aguri drivers